Jakub Kousal (born 6 September 2002) is a Czech footballer who plays for MFK Skalica as an midfielder, on loan from SK Dynamo České Budějovice.

Club career

SK Dynamo České Budějovice
Kousal made his Fortuna Liga debut for SK Dynamo České Budějovice against 1. FC Slovácko on 23 May 2021.

References

External links
 SK Dynamo České Budějovice official club profile 
 Futbalnet profile 
 
 

2002 births
Living people
Prague-West District
Czech footballers
Association football midfielders
SK Dynamo České Budějovice players
MFK Skalica players
Czech First League players
2. Liga (Slovakia) players